Raczyce may refer to the following places in Poland:
Raczyce, Jawor County in Lower Silesian Voivodeship (south-west Poland)
Raczyce, Ząbkowice Śląskie County in Lower Silesian Voivodeship (south-west Poland)
Raczyce, Świętokrzyskie Voivodeship (south-central Poland)
Raczyce, Greater Poland Voivodeship (west-central Poland)